William, Willie, Bill or Billy Naughton may refer to:

Bill Naughton (1910–1992), playwright
Willie Naughton (1868–?), Scottish football player (Stoke, Southampton)
Willie Naughton (footballer, born 1962), Scottish football player (Preston North End, Walsall)

Human name disambiguation pages